Calendar Girl Murders is a 1984 television movie directed by William A. Graham and starred Tom Skerritt and Sharon Stone, who played the part of photographer Cassie Bascomb.

Plot
Millionaire publisher Richard Trainor (Robert Culp) is celebrating the success of his new calendar, featuring twelve beautiful nude women. However, the party is ruined when Miss January is pushed off a building. Later in the evening, Miss February is knifed to death. Police Lieutenant Dan Stoner (Tom Skerritt) is assigned to the case and he immediately strikes up a friendship with photographer Cassie Bascomb (Sharon Stone). While Dan investigates the case,  Cassie is attacked. What connection might she have to the case, if any... and will the murderer be caught before he/she reaches Miss December?

Cast
Sharon Stone as Cassie Bascomb
Robert Culp as Richard Trainor
Tom Skerritt as Lt. Dan Stoner
Barbara Parkins as Cleo Banks
Alan Thicke as Alan Conti
Robert Beltran as Mooney
Barbara Bosson as Nancy
Claudia Christian as Kara
Michael C. Gwynne as Krell
Pat Corley as Tony
Robert Morse as Nat Couray
Wendy Kilbourne as Heather English
Silvana Gallardo as Detective Rose Hernandez

Reception
Sue Heal at Radio Times wrote:A chance to see Sharon Stone on the early road to stardom in this steamy, over-larded tale of a serial killer with a penchant for bumping off centrefolds. Detective Tom Skerritt struggles successfully to keep a straight face in the eye of a storm of hoary clichés, as the meticulous killer works his way through the months like an over-zealous accountant. Misses January and February have bitten the soft-focus dust. Can Miss March possibly survive?

References

External links
 
 Calendar Girl Murders at Turner Classic Movies

1984 television films
1984 films
1984 crime films
1984 thriller films
1980s American films
1980s crime thriller films
1980s English-language films
ABC network original films
American crime thriller films
American thriller television films
Crime television films
Films directed by William Graham (director)
Films scored by Brad Fiedel